Zoo Magazine is based in Amsterdam, Netherlands, and was created on 25 September 2003. It focuses on fashion, art, literature and architecture and is published four times a year. The predominantly German based subject matter has recently expanded into a more international context and the magazine is now published in both English and German.

Photographers 
Its support for photography has attracted some of the best fashion photographers in the world, such as Steven Klein, Donald McPherson, David La Chapelle, Terry Richardson, Nobuyoshi Araki, Hedi Slimane and Karl Lagerfeld.

Ownership 
Zoo Magazine is the trading name of Melon Collie C.V.. The magazine was co-founded in Berlin by Sandor Lubbe and musician Bryan Adams, who also photographs for it.

References

External links 
 Zoo magazine

2003 establishments in the Netherlands
Bryan Adams
Literary magazines published in the Netherlands
English-language magazines
German-language magazines
Magazines established in 2003
Magazines published in Amsterdam
Quarterly magazines published in the Netherlands
Visual arts magazines
Magazines published in Berlin
Bilingual magazines